Helmut Unger (born 2 June 1943) is a German cross-country skier. He competed in the men's 30 kilometre event at the 1968 Winter Olympics.

References

External links
 

1943 births
Living people
German male cross-country skiers
Olympic cross-country skiers of East Germany
Cross-country skiers at the 1968 Winter Olympics
People from Falkenstein, Saxony
Sportspeople from Saxony